Harry Jones (26 October 1911 – 22 February 1957) was an English footballer who played at inside-right and centre-forward. He was nicknamed Popeye.

Biography 
Jones was born in Haydock, Lancashire. He signed as a professional with Preston North End in July 1928 before moving on to West Bromwich Albion for £500 in 1933. Jones appeared as a guest player for Everton and Blackburn Rovers during the early part of the Second World War, before retiring due to illness and injury in 1943. He died in Preston in 1957, aged 45.

References 
 

1911 births
1957 deaths
People from Haydock
English footballers
Association football forwards
Preston North End F.C. players
West Bromwich Albion F.C. players